Edward Hare Pickersgill (1850 – 13 October 1911) was an English Liberal Party politician who sat in the House of Commons from 1885 to 1911.

Biography
Pickersgill was the son of Thomas Pickersgill, an architect of York. He was educated at York Grammar School before entering employment at the age of 18 as a clerk in Savings Bank Department of the Post Office, remaining there until 1885. He graduated with a B.A. from London University in 1872 and was called to the bar at the Inner Temple in 1884, and practiced as a Treasury counsel at the Old Bailey.

At the 1885 general election Pickersgill was elected Member of Parliament for Bethnal Green South West. He was regarded as being on the Radical wing of the Liberal Party, and campaigned for reform of criminal law, in particular seeking to end imprisonment for non-payment of debt. He also sought the abolition of the death penalty and the ending of flogging as a punishment. From 1892 to 1895 he was a Progressive Party member of the London County Council representing Hackney Central. At the "khaki" general election of 1900 he lost his seat to a Unionist opponent, but regained it six years later when there was a swing to the Liberals. He held the seat at the two general elections of 1910, but resigned from the Commons by taking the Manor of Northstead in July 1911 in order to take up a post as a stipendary magistrate.

In October 1911 he contracted pneumonia and died at his sister's house in Putney, aged 61.

References

External links

 

1850 births
1911 deaths
Liberal Party (UK) MPs for English constituencies
UK MPs 1885–1886
UK MPs 1886–1892
UK MPs 1892–1895
UK MPs 1895–1900
UK MPs 1906–1910
UK MPs 1910
UK MPs 1910–1918
Members of London County Council
Members of the Inner Temple
Progressive Party (London) politicians
Alumni of the University of London